The Albert Shaw Lectures on Diplomatic History are annual lectures delivered at Johns Hopkins University in Baltimore, Maryland.  The lectures were named after the benefactor, Albert Shaw of New York City who had received his Ph.D from Johns Hopkins University in history and who was editor of The American Review of Reviews.  Shaw lecturers over the years have included the following:

1899: John H. Latané 
1900: James Morton Callahan
1906: Jesse Siddall Reeves
1907: Elbert Jay Benton 
1909: Ephraim Douglass Adams
1911: Charles O. Paullin 
1912: Isaac Joslin Cox
1913: William R. Manning
1914: Frank A. Updyke
1916: Payson Jackson Treat
1921: Percy Alvin Martin
1924: Henry Merritt Wriston
1926: Samuel Flagg Bemis
1927: Bruce Williams
1928: J. Fred Rippy
1929: Joseph Byrne Lockey
1930: Víctor Andrés Belaúnde
1931: Charles C. Tansill
1932:
1933: Charles Seymour
1934:
1935: Frank A. Simonds
1936: Julius W. Pratt
1937: Dexter Perkins
1938:
1939: Albert K. Weinberg
1940:
1941: Thomas A. Bailey
1942: Wilfred H. Callcott
1943:
1944:
1945:
1946: Malbone Watson Graham
1947:
1948:
1949:
1950:
1951:
1952:
1953: Howard K. Beale
1954: Max Beloff
1955:
1956: Arthur S. Link
1957:
1958: Gordon A. Craig
1959:
1960:
1961: Herbert George Nicholas
1968: Robert A. Divine
1979: Bradford Perkins
1980:
1981:
1982:
1983:
1984:
1985:
1986:
1987:
1988: Akira Iriye
1998: Charles E. Neu, Brian Balogh, George C. Herring, Robert K. Brigham, and Robert S. McNamara

References

Shaw, Albert